is Yukari Tamura's fourth album, released on March 2, 2005.

Track listing
 
 Arrangement and composition: Kaoru Okubo
 Spring Fever
 Lyrics: Manami Fujino
 Arrangement and composition: Yukari Hashimoto
 Ever-Never-Land
 Lyrics: Kanade Kotowa
 Arrangement and composition: Masatomo Ota
 Opening theme song for  OVA series
 Fallin' Into you
 Lyrics: Yuki Matsuura
 Arrangement and composition: Takuya Watanabe
 
 Lyrics: Uran
 Arrangement and composition: Kaoru Okubo
 Opening theme song of her radio show, .
 
 Lyrics: Uran
 Arrangement and composition: Kaoru Okubo
 fantasia
 Lyrics and composition: Mika Watanabe
 Arrangement: Mika Watanabe and Kanichirou Kubo
 
 Lyrics: Mika Watanbe
 Composition: Shinji Tamura
 Arrangement: Yasunari Nakamura
 
 Lyrics: Yukari Tamura
 Composition: HULK
 Arrangement: Kaoru Okubo
  
 Lyrics: Risa Horie
 Composition: Hiroyuki Ichiki
 Arrangement: Kaoru Okubo
  
 Arrangement and composition: Kaoru Okubo
  
 Lyrics, arrangement and composition: marhy
 Little Wish ～first step～
 Lyrics: Karen Shiina
 Arrangement and composition: Masatomo Ota
 Ending theme song for 
 Picnic
 Lyrics: Miku Hazuki
 Composition and arrangement: Kazuya Komatsu

References 

Yukari Tamura albums
2005 albums